Kodomo is the Japanese word for child. 

Kodomo may also refer to:

 Kodomo (musician), the moniker for electronic musician Chris Child
 Children's anime and manga or kodomo, manga with a target demographic of children
 Kodomo, a toothpaste brand from Lion Corporation

See also
 Komodo (disambiguation)